Recipe for Disaster is the second full-length album by the American hard rock band Brand New Sin. It was released in 2005 via Century Media Records.

Singles included "Black and Blue," for which a music video was made, and "Days Are Numbered."

Critical reception
AllMusic called the album "a fine one, with more than enough high-water marks to counter the lows, and more than enough sheer 'rawk' gumption to stand out from the cookie-cutter radio rockers out there." PopMatters called the album "a confident step forward," writing that it is "the perfect music for a summer afternoon with a tubful of beer on ice." Exclaim! derided the "vocals that sound like a furious and bowel-obstructed Scott Stapp, tired mid-tempo Southern rock blues-riffing punctuated by occasional hints of thrash, and enough debased artificial harmonic guitar solo wankery to make Dimebag Darrell roll over in his grave."

Track listing

"Arrived" – 3:10
"The Loner" – 2:33
"Brown Street Betty" – 3:20
"Black and Blue" – 3:16
"Running Alone" – 4:04
"Freight Train" – 3:33
"Vicious Cycles" – 3:45
"Another Reason" – 5:19
"Days Are Numbered" – 3:19
"Once in a Lifetime" – 4:23
"Dead Man Walking" – 3:38
"Gulch" – 0:39
"Wyoming" – 6:09

Personnel
 Joe Altier – vocals
 Kris Wiechmann – guitar
 Kenny Dunham – guitar
 Chuck Kahl – bass
 Kevin Dean – drums
 Engineered and mixed by Pete Walker
 Mastered by Alan Douches at West Side Music

References

External links
 www.brandnewsin.org

Brand New Sin albums
2006 albums